Shigeya Suzuki (鈴木茂也, Suzuki Shigeya, born May 5, 1979), more commonly known under his pseudonym Akihito Tsukushi (つくしあきひと, Tsukushi Akihito) is a Japanese illustrator, manga artist and designer from Sagamihara, Kanagawa. Suzuki also goes by the name Ichimi Tokusa (とくさ一味, Tokusa Ichimi).

Overview
Tsukushi hails from the Kanagawa Prefecture, attending Tachibana Gakuen High School before graduating from Tokyo Design Academy in illustration. He worked at Konami from 2000 to 2010 before becoming a freelance illustrator. During his time at Konami, he primarily worked in animation and designing the interface of titles such as Elebits, and the character design for the Nintendo DS game Elebits: The Adventures of Kai and Zero and the anime Otogi-Jūshi Akazukin.

After leaving Konami, Tsukushi began drawing manga, debuting in 2011 in the dōjinshi Star Strings Yori (スターストリングスより). In 2012, Takeshobo began serializing his manga Made in Abyss (メイドインアビス) on their Web Comic Gamma website. It would later receive an anime adaptation in 2017.

His work is characterized by detailed descriptions and narrative drawings. He cites Norman Rockwell as a person he admires.

Works

Manga
Made in Abyss (メイドインアビス) (Published by Takeshobo, 11 volumes, 2012 -)
From Star Strings (スターストリングスより) (Published by Takeshobo, 1 volume, 2017 )

Anime
Otogi-Jūshi Akazukin (おとぎ銃士 赤ずきん) (Character design) (is credited as Ichimi Tokusa in the OVA)
The Lost Village (迷家-マヨイガ-) (Nanaki village design)

Video games
Elebits and Elebits: The Adventures of Kai and Zero (Fine arts, character design)
The Sword of Etheria (OZ -オズ-) (Monster design, character animation) (is credited as Shigeya Suzuki)
Suikoden III
LovePlus
Dewy's Adventure (水精デューイの大冒険!!) (Character design)
Made in Abyss: Binary Star Falling into Darkness (Original story supervisor)

References

External links
 

Living people
1979 births
People from Sagamihara
Manga artists from Kanagawa Prefecture
Konami people
Japanese illustrators
Pages with unreviewed translations